Eureaioi (or Eurea [Εὒρεα]; perhaps even Eureai [Εὐρεαῖ]) is the assumed name of a "possible" ancient Greek city-state of Magnesia or Pelasgiotis in ancient Thessaly. The name Εὐρεαῖοι is not attested, but originates indirectly from minted coins dated to 4th century BCE bearing the legend «ΕΥΡΕΑΙΩΝ» (considered a demonym). Several scholars have made a few suggestions about the community's location, or have connected it with other existing ancient towns of the area.

References

Populated places in ancient Thessaly
Former populated places in Greece
Thessalian city-states
Lost ancient cities and towns
Ancient Magnesia
Pelasgiotis